The Vietnam Military History Museum, set up on 17 July 1956, is one of seven national museums in Vietnam. It covers 12,800 m2. It is situated in central Hanoi, opposite the Lenin Park and near the Ho Chi Minh Mausoleum. The Flag Tower of Hanoi is located inside of the museum grounds.

Layout

The museum consists of various buildings. Eras of Vietnamese military history are showcased in different buildings on the complex. The Flag Tower of Hanoi is within the bounds of the complex as well. It is possible for visitors to enter the first two tiers of the tower, however, the spire is inaccessible.

The museum also includes a display of decommissioned, captured or destroyed military equipment and vehicles used by French, Viet Minh, North Vietnam, South Vietnam and the United States during the First and Second Indochina Wars. This display, located right next to the Flag Tower of Hanoi, has become known as "The Garden of Toys". There is a Highlands Coffee chain store in which visitors can rest, as well as souvenir shops where one may browse various products.

Exhibits 

The museum does not always give context or explanation surrounding the exhibits. The exhibits mostly consist of artifacts. It is best to inform oneself about the First and Second Indochina wars if one wants to understand the artifacts and the references within the notecards.

There are some English and French placards containing information on the war eras. Audiovisual elements are often only available in Vietnamese. Note cards explaining each artifact are in both Vietnamese, French and English.

This museum presents the First and second Indochina wars.

A History of Vietnam's Military conflicts

Taken from a placard on the Vietnamese Military History Museum

 214 – 207 BC :Resistance war against the Qin
 208 – 179 BC :Resistance war against the Zhao
 40 – 43: Resistance war against the Eastern Han's domination
 542 – 548 : Resistance war against the Liang's domination
 603: Resistance war against the Sui's domination
 687 – 905 : Resistance war against the Tang's domination
 930 – 938 :Resistance war against the Southern Han
 1077 : Resistance war against the Song
 1258 – 1288 : Resistance war against the Mongolian
 1406 – 1427 : Resistance war against the Ming's domination
 1785 – 1789 :Resistance war against the Siam – Qing
 1858 – 1954 : Resistance war against the French colonists
 1954 – 1975 : Resistance war against the American imperialist, liberate the nation

Pre-Colonial Exhibition
This era was highlighted by invasions from neighbouring countries through the years 214 BC to 1789. A placard details the Vietnamese Resistance Wars against Invaders in history.
Various artifacts during these years are on display while quotations and murals attributed to previous emperors are arranged on the walls. Several scenarios depicting their actions on keeping the invaders away are complete with figurines to clearly illustrate their battles during this era.

Second Indochina War

There is a wide variety of displays seen in the museum focusing  on the second Indochina war (The Vietnam War) through many exhibits presenting information of the tactics of the American Imperialists and the different manners in which war was approached in Vietnam, through a focus on the "Vietnamization of War" as well as the many other failures of the Americans, a large portion of the displays are used to symbolize and reinforce the willpower and determination of the Vietnamese.

The museum also has a large compilation of posters, newspapers and pictures demonstrating the global support condemning the Americans in the war including countries such as Congo, North Korea, Netherlands, Venezuela and Cuba. The museum also boats a very large collection of old machinery and artillery named the "Garden of Broken toys" which were shot down by the Vietnamese including a B-52 sculpture to demonstrate the strength of the Vietnamese during the war, a Chinook, many soviet tanks, and torpedo launchers.

Items on outside display

Items on display include:

37 mm automatic air defense gun M1939 (61-K)
57 mm AZP S-60
85 mm divisional gun D-44
130 mm towed field gun M1954 (M-46)
Bell UH-1H Iroquois
Wreckage of a Boeing B-52G shot down during Operation Linebacker II
Cessna A-37B Dragonfly
Douglas A-1E and A-1H Skyraiders
M3 Half-track purportedly used by Groupe Mobile 100 and captured in the Battle of Mang Yang Pass
M101 howitzer
M107 Self-Propelled Gun
M113 armored personnel carrier
M114 155 mm howitzer
Mikoyan-Gurevich MiG-21 MF & PFM
SA-2 Guideline SAM
T-34 tank
T-54 tank

References

External links

Photos of the Vietnam Military History Museum

Museums established in 1956
Museums in Hanoi
National museums
Military and war museums in Vietnam
Vietnam War museums
French colonial architecture in Vietnam
1956 establishments in Vietnam